The Sturgeon class (known colloquially in naval circles as the 637 class''') was a class of nuclear-powered fast attack submarines (SSN) in service with the United States Navy from the 1960s until 2004. They were the "workhorses" of the Navy's attack submarine fleet throughout much of the Cold War.

Design

The Sturgeons were essentially lengthened and improved variants of the Thresher/Permit class that directly preceded them. The five-compartment arrangement of the Permits was retained, including the bow compartment, operations compartment, reactor compartment, auxiliary machinery room no. 2, and the engine room. The extra length was in the operations compartment, including longer torpedo racks to accommodate additional Mark 37 torpedoes, the most advanced in service at the time of the class's design in the late 1950s. The class was redesigned to SUBSAFE requirements concurrently with the construction of the first units, with seawater, main ballast, and other systems modified for improved safety. The biggest difference was the much larger sail, which permitted a second periscope and additional intelligence-gathering masts, and which reduced the risk of the submarine broaching the surface in heavy seas. The fairwater planes mounted on the sail could rotate 90 degrees, allowing the submarine to surface through thin ice.
The last nine Sturgeons were lengthened  to provide more space for electronic equipment and habitability. The extra space also helped facilitate the use of dry deck shelters first deployed in 1982.

The class received mid-life upgrades in the 1980s, including the BQQ-5 sonar suite with a retractable towed array, Mk 117 torpedo fire control equipment, and other electronics upgrades.

Armament
The Sturgeon-class boats were equipped to carry the Harpoon missile, the Tomahawk cruise missile, the UUM-44 SUBROC, the Mark 67 SLMM and Mark 60 CAPTOR mines, and the MK-48 and ADCAP torpedoes. Torpedo tubes were located amidships to accommodate the bow-mounted sonar. The bow covering the sonar sphere was made from steel or glass reinforced plastic (GRP), both varieties having been produced both booted and not booted. Booted domes are covered with a half-inch layer of rubber. The GRP domes improved the bow sonar sphere performance; though for intelligence gathering missions, the towed-array sonar was normally used as it was a much more sensitive array.

Noise reduction
Several Sturgeon boats and related submarines were modifications of the original designs to test ways to reduce noise.
 was outfitted with Raytheon Harmonic Power Conditioners which eliminated an electrical bus noise problem that was inherent in the class. This was done by harmonic conditioning of the power system.  This successful feature was later outfitted on the entire class.
 and  among others were outfitted with SHT (Special Hull Treatment) during a non-refueling overhaul, which reduced noise and the submarine sonar profile.
, a one-ship class, was completed using a turbo-electric system for main propulsion rather than a reduction gear drive from the steam turbines.
, the quietest submarine of her era, was had a similar but distinct design to the Sturgeon-class submarines. The Narwhal (SCB 245) and the Sturgeon class (SCB 188A) were developed simultaneously. Forward the Narwhal resembled the Sturgeon-class submarines, but with a relocated diesel generator and slightly greater beam. Aft she had the natural circulation S5G reactor and a direct-drive turbine, along with several other quieting features. Unlike the Sturgeon class, the Narwhal did not fully comply with SUBSAFE regulations due to her unique main seawater system.

Variants
A number of the long hull Sturgeon-class SSNs, including Parche, L. Mendel Rivers, and Richard B. Russell were involved in top-secret reconnaissance missions, including cable tap operations in the Barents and Okhotsk seas. Parche received nine Presidential Unit Citations for successful missions.

A total of seven boats were modified to carry the SEAL Dry Deck Shelter (DDS). The DDS is a submersible launch hangar with a lockout chamber attached to the ship's midships weapons shipping hatch, facilitating the use of SEAL Delivery Vehicles. DDS-equipped boats were tasked with the covert insertion of special forces.

Boats

From Register of Ships of the US Navy, 1775-1990.

Short hull

 
 
 
 
 
 
 
 
 
 
 
 
 
 
 
 
 
 
 
 
 
 
 
 
 
 
 
 

Long hull

  (DDS)
  (DDS)
  (ex-Redfish) (DDS)
  (DDS)
  (DDS)
  (R&D)
  (DDS)
  (DDS)
 

Derivatives
One other Navy vessel was based on the Sturgeon'' hull, but was modified for experimental reasons:

See also
 List of submarines of the United States Navy
 List of submarine classes of the United States Navy

References

Citations

Sources

External links

 fas.org: Sturgeon class
 Bellona Report 
 Photo galleries of US nuclear attack submarines at NavSource.org
 https://www.miwsr.com/2022-033.aspx

Submarine classes
 
 Sturgeon class
 Sturgeon class